Iglesia de San Pedro (Pola de Siero) is a 19th-century, Neoclassical-style, Roman Catholic church in Pola de Siero, Siero, Asturias, Spain.

See also
Asturian art
Catholic Church in Spain

References

External links

Churches in Asturias
19th-century Roman Catholic church buildings in Spain
Roman Catholic churches completed in 1842